William A. Heelan was an American lyricist during the early 20th century. He collaborated with a number of composers and lyricists including E. P. Moran,  Seymour Furth, J. Fred Helf and Harry Von Tilzer.

Credits 

 1899 "I'd Leave My Happy Home for You", "Rauss mit ihm"
 1900 "Every Race Has a Flag but the Coon", "In The House Of Too Much Trouble", "There Are Two Sides To A Story".
 1901 "Ha-le ha-lo" or "That's what the Germans sang", "Maizy, my dusky daisy"
 1902 "The Message Of The Rose".
 1903 "The Message Of The Rose".
 1906 "Alice, Where Art Thou Going?", "Nothing Like That In Our Family"
 1907 "No Wedding Bells For Me".
 1908 "A Singer Sang A Song".

References

External links 
 Tin Pan Alley Composer and lyricist Biographies

American male composers
American composers
American music publishers (people)
Year of death missing
Year of birth missing